Eupithecia chlorofasciata is a moth in the family Geometridae. It is found in North America, including Kentucky.

References

Moths described in 1872
chlorofasciata
Moths of North America